Bill Kenny is an English retired professional soccer forward who played at least one season in the American Soccer League. In 1977, he scored seven goals in twenty games for the Cleveland Cobras.

References

American Soccer League (1933–1983) players
Cleveland Cobras players
Living people
Association football forwards
English footballers
English expatriate footballers
Expatriate soccer players in the United States
English expatriate sportspeople in the United States
Year of birth missing (living people)